A newbie is a slang term for a novice or newcomer.

Newbie may also refer to:

 Newbie, Dumfries and Galloway, including Newbie Barns, a place in Scotland
 A nickname of J.D. (Scrubs)

See also
 Newby (disambiguation)
 Newbee, an eSports team based in China